"Vivre" is a song written by Luc Plamondon and Riccardo Cocciante for the musical Notre-Dame de Paris. It was recorded in 1997 by Noa and included on the Notre-Dame de Paris album (1998). The song was also recorded by Hélène Ségara in 1998, who was selected to play Esméralda in the musical, following the withdrawal of Noa. Celine Dion recorded an English-language version titled "Live (for the One I Love)" with lyrics by Will Jennings and included it on her 1999 greatest hits compilation, All the Way... A Decade of Song. In 2000, Dion's version and another recording of "Live (for the One I Love)" by Tina Arena were included on the English-language version of Notre-Dame de Paris album.

Noa version

Israeli singer Achinoam Nini, known as Noa recorded the part of Esméralda in French for the original soundtrack of the musical Notre-Dame de Paris. Released in January 1998, the soundtrack topped the albums chart in France for seventeen weeks and was certified Diamond after selling over two million copies in France alone. It became one of the best-selling albums of all time in France.

"Vivre" by Noa was released as the first single of the musical in February 1998. The track was produced by Riccardo Cocciante, Jannick Top and Serge Perathoner. It topped the singles chart in France for eighteen weeks and in Belgium for nineteen weeks. It peaked at number twenty in France in March 1998 and number twelve in Belgium Wallonia in May 1998. "Vivre" was also featured on the Noa's French greatest hits album "Le Meilleur de Noa" in 1999.

Formats and track listing

Charts

Hélène Ségara version
In 1997, Hélène Ségara auditioned for the role of Esméralda, the female lead in Luc Plamondon and Riccardo Cocciante's musical Notre-Dame de Paris. However, Noa was chosen to play the role. After recording the album version of Notre-Dame de Paris, Noa decided that her hectic schedule would not allow her to set off on tour with the stage version of the musical. Plamondon and Cocciante were thus faced with the problem of finding a new Esméralda to step in and take Noa's place at the last moment. And it was then that the pair came up with the idea of casting Ségara in the role. After the premiere in Paris in September 1998, Notre-Dame de Paris musical became a phenomenal commercial success. Ségara included "Vivre" on the 1998 re-release of her album, Cœur de verre.

Celine Dion version

After the success of the musical Notre-Dame de Paris in 1998 and 1999, all the songs were translated into English. One of the songs, "Vivre" with new lyrics by Will Jennings was entitled "Live (for the One I Love)" and recorded by Celine Dion for her 1999 greatest hits compilation, All the Way... A Decade of Song. The track was produced by David Foster and Humberto Gatica. It was released as the second single in the Francophone countries on 14 February 2000. Dion's version was also featured on the English-language version of Notre-Dame de Paris album released on 21 February 2000. It was revealed at the time of release that Luc Plamondon had created the role of Esmeralda with Celine Dion in mind, which he told her when she attended the show in Paris. 

"Live (for the One I Love)" music video was directed by Bille Woodruff and released in 2000. It was included later on Dion's All the Way... A Decade of Song & Video DVD. The single reached top 100 on the charts in several countries, including number twenty-three in Canada, number forty-seven in Belgium Wallonia and number sixty-three in France. Dion performed the song in late 1999, during the promotion of All the Way... A Decade of Song on the French television show. She also sang it live during the last of the Let's Talk About Love World Tour show, called the "Millennium Concert". AllMusic senior editor Stephen Thomas Erlewine said that this song, alongside "I Want You to Need Me" and "Then You Look at Me", "isn't bad, it just isn't that particularly memorable, especially compared to the hits".

Formats and track listing

Charts

Tina Arena version

Tina Arena played Esméralda in the London production of Notre-Dame de Paris musical in 2000. She was offered the role after Luc Plamondon noticed her performing abilities on various variety shows on French television. She recorded four songs for the English-language version of Notre-Dame de Paris album, including "Live (for the One I Love)."

Arena's version was released as a single in the United Kingdom on 6 March 2000 and reached number sixty-three on the UK Singles Chart in May 2000. Arena's version was produced by Ric Wake. It was performed live on French prime-time television programme "Tapis Rouge", with Tina Arena breaking down in tears at the end of the song, and at the 2000 World Music Awards in Monte-Carlo, where Tina Arena received the award for the world's best-selling Australian recording artist of the year.

Formats and track listing

Charts

Other versions 
In 2000, after Tina Arena's original run as Esmeralda on London's West End, fellow Australian singer and actress Dannii Minogue took over the role. Though her version of "Live for the one I love" was never released as a single, a live music video was captured in which she performed in costume and on the actual musical's stage. The video was included as a bonus track in the 2007 retrospective DVD release Dannii Minogue : The Video Collection.

In 2016, Lebanese singer Hiba Tawaji was cast as Esmeralda for the French revival of the musical. In November of the same year, her version of Vivre was released to download and streaming platforms. The accompanying music video, shot in Paris, features scenes along the Seine river with the actual Notre-Dame de Paris cathedral as a backdrop.

References

External links

Noa (singer) songs
Hélène Ségara songs
Celine Dion songs
Tina Arena songs
1998 singles
2000 singles
Pop ballads
Songs from musicals
Songs with lyrics by Luc Plamondon
Songs with lyrics by Will Jennings
Song recordings produced by David Foster
Music videos directed by Bille Woodruff
Songs written by Riccardo Cocciante
1997 songs
1990s ballads